The Mexican Association for International Education (AMPEI)  [AMPEI],  is a non-profit membership organization which brings together international educators from Mexican higher education institutions.

Its core membership is composed by individuals in charge of the different international education activities in colleges and universities from Mexico, and elsewhere.

AMPEI has developed a collaborative work with related organizations from other parts of the world, such as NAFSA, CONAHEC, CBIE, and EAIE.

AMPEI also works actively with the different Embassies in Mexico, as well as government agencies and foundations, engaged in supporting international education and academic exchanges in higher education.

History 

AMPEI was founded in 1992 in a meeting in which Sylvia Ortega-Salazar was elected as its first President.

Later, the leadership of the organization has been presided by:

 Jocelyne Gacel-Avila, Universidad de Guadalajara
 Ofelia Cervantes, Universidad de las Americas
 Martín Pantoja, Universidad de Guanajuato
 Antonio Osuna, Universidad Panamericana- Guadalajara
 Norma Juárez, Universidad Autonoma del Estado de Morelos
 Thomas Buntru, Universidad de Monterrey
 Alicia Cabrero, Universidad Autónoma de San Luis Potosí

In addition, AMPEI has an External Advisory Board which has been presided by:

 Julio Rubio-Oca, then Understecretary for Higher Education, Mexico
 Francisco Marmolejo, Executive Director of CONAHEC.
 Antonio Osuna, Universidad Panamericana.

Leadership 

The current President is América M. Lizárraga González, from Universidad Autónoma de Sinaloa..

Activities 
AMPEI conducts a series of activities, including:

 Conducting professional development of individuals involved in international education and academic exchanges in Mexican colleges and universities
 Promoting academic exchanges and collaboration among higher education institutions in Mexico and abroad
 Research and analysis of management processes in international education
 Dissemination of relevant information
 Recommending policies and practices aimed at fostering the development of international education in Mexico.
 Hosting conferences

References

External links 
AMPEI's Official site
Mexican Association of Universities (ANUIES)
Consortium for North American Higher Education Collaboration (CONAHEC)
NAFSA: Association of International Educators
European Association of International Education(EAIE)
Canadian Bureau for International Education(CBIE)
Network of International Education Associations

See also
International education

Organizations established in 1992
Educational organizations based in Mexico